AMC-15 is an American communications satellite. Owned by SES Americom, AMC-15 was designed to be placed in geostationary orbit, following launch on a Proton-M / Briz-M space vehicle.

Satellite description 
Built by Lockheed Martin and based on the A2100AXS satellite bus, AMC-15 is located at 105° West longitude for EchoStar. AMC-15 has 24 Ku-band and 12 Ka-band transponders covering United States (including Hawaii and Alaska), part of Canada and Mexico. Leased to Echostar Satellite Services.

Launch 
It was launched atop a Proton-M / Briz-M launch vehicle at 21:23:00 UTC on 14 October 2004, from Site 200/39 at the Baikonur Cosmodrome in Kazakhstan. AMC-15 is completely leased to EchoStar Satellite Services.

See also 

 2004 in spaceflight

References 

Spacecraft launched in 2004
SES satellites
Satellites using the A2100 bus